Charles Henry Meldon, LL.D., QC (1841 – 15 May 1892) was an Irish barrister and nationalist politician who took his seat in the United Kingdom House of Commons as Member of Parliament (MP) for Kildare from 1874 to 1885.

Career 
A Dublin-based barrister
with an address in Rutland Square (now Parnell Square),
Meldon was a Queen's Counsel and a justice of the peace for counties Dublin, Kildare, Meath, and Westmeath. He was a member of the Royal Commission established in 1878 to enquire into the Registration of Deeds, which reported in 1879 and 1880.

He was first elected to Parliament at the 1874 general election, as a Home Rule League candidate, when he defeated the sitting Liberal MP Lord Otho FitzGerald. He was re-elected as a Home Ruler in 1880, and joined the new Irish Parliamentary Party (IPP) when it was created in 1882.  When the Kildare constituency was divided at the 1885 general election, he did not stand for re-election.

Arms

References

External links 
 

1841 births
1892 deaths
UK MPs 1874–1880
UK MPs 1880–1885
Members of the Parliament of the United Kingdom for County Kildare constituencies (1801–1922)
Home Rule League MPs
Irish Parliamentary Party MPs
Irish barristers
Politicians from County Dublin